The Diocese of Huesca (Latin, Oscensis) is a Latin Church ecclesiastical territory or diocese of the Catholic Church located in north-eastern Spain, in the province of Huesca, part of the autonomous community of Aragón. The Diocese of Huesca is a suffragan diocese in the ecclesiastical province of the metropolitan Archdiocese of Zaragoza.

The diocese encompasses parts of the province of Huesca in north-eastern Spain, seven parishes in the Broto valley and three within the territorial limits of the Archdiocese of Saragossa, one parish being situated in the city of Saragossa itself.

The Diocese of Huesca was created in or before the 6th century; after the Moorish conquest of 713 its bishops moved to Aragon (the itinerant "Bishops of Aragon"). The episcopal seat was established in Jaca during 1063-1096, then finally moved back to Huesca after king Pedro I of Aragon took the city from the Moors in November 1096.

History

Early history (c. 500 – 713)

The date of origin of the diocese cannot be definitely ascertained; the earliest evidence of its existence is the signature of Gabinius, Bishop of Huesca, to the decrees of the Third Council of Toledo, held in 589. Isidore of Seville, writing in the 7th century,  mentions the presence of Elpidius, Bishop of Huesca, at an earlier council, but this is not considered authoritative.  The year of the diocese being erected is given as 533.

After 589, we next hear of the diocese through a synod held there in 598 which ordered annual diocesan conferences and enacted various disciplinary measures.

Itinerant bishops of Aragon (713–1063)

The Moorish invasion of 710 rapidly worked toward Huesca; when the city was taken in 713 the bishop fled, and the diocese was directed from Aragon by itinerant bishops, sometimes called bishops of Aragon, sometimes bishops of Huesca or Jaca, who lived either at Jaca or in the neighbouring monasteries of San Juan de la Peña, San Pedro de Siresa, and San Adrián de Sasabe.

Among the bishops of Aragon were:

 . c. 920 : Iñigo
 . c. 922 : Ferriolus
 933–947 : Fortuño
 971–978 : Aureolus
 . c. 981 : Atón
 1011–1036 : Mancius
 1036–1057 : García
 1058–1075 : Sancho
 1076–1086 : García Ramírez
 1087–1097 : Peter

Jaca as seat of the bishops of Huesca (1063–1096)

A council held at Jaca in 1063 determined anew the boundaries of the Diocese of Huesca, which thereafter included the present dioceses of Huesca, Jaca, and Barbastro, as well as a part of the Diocese of Lérida. Jaca was then made the permanent seat of the diocese.

At the same time Sancho II was appointed Bishop of Huesca, and hastened to request the Pope Alexander II to confirm the decisions of the council. In the same year of 1063, however, King Sancho Ramirez of Aragon (1063-1094) had won back from the Moors the city of Barbastro, and had granted it to the Bishop of Roda. García Ramírez, the new Bishop of Huesca (1076–1086) and the king's brother, regarded this as an infringement of the rights of jurisdiction granted the Bishop of Jaca by the council of Jaca. He therefore renewed his petition to the new pope (Gregory VII) to have the decisions of the council confirmed, which request the pope granted . As, however, Bishop Raimundo of Roda also obtained the confirmation of all his privileges from Gregory, a violent dispute arose between the Bishops of Huesca and Roda as to jurisdiction over the churches of Barbastro, Bielsa, Gistao, and Alquezar, which in 1080 was decided by the king in favour of the Bishop of Roda.

Bishops' seat returns to Huesca (1096–present)

In November 1096, King Pedro I of Aragon took back Huesca from the Moors and restored the original see. 
Pope Urban II decreed (May 11, 1098) that, instead of Jaca, Huesca should again be the seat of the bishop, as it had been until the year 713 .

But Jaca itself had a separate existence under a vicar-general, independent of the Bishop of Huesca. It also retained its own cathedral chapter, which originally followed the Rule of St. Augustine, but in 1270 both this chapter and that of Huesca were secularized.

The history of the Diocese of Huesca is from this time on closely associated with that of the present Diocese of Barbastro.

The episcopal city of Huesca was long a centre for education and art. Ancient Osca was the seat of the famous school of Sertorius. After the failure of his plans at Perpignan, king Pedro IV of Aragon in 1354 established a university at Huesca, which was maintained by a tax laid on the city's food, and which pursued a steady if not a brilliant existence until it was eclipsed by the great college at Saragossa.

In 1571, the Diocese of Barbastro was erected out of part of Huesca. From 1848 to 1851 the See of Huesca was vacant. The Concordat of 1851 formally annexed Barbastro once more to Huesca, but preserving its name and administration, being administered by a vicar Apostolic.

Population figures for the Diocese
In 1910 the Diocese of Huesca comprised 181 parishes and 15 subsidiary parishes, with 240 priests and 50 churches and chapels. It had a Catholic population of 87,659.

In 1950 there were 110,000 Catholics in the diocese.  There were 196 parishes in the diocese.  By 1980 there were 76,500 Catholics in the diocese, and it had 197 parishes.  The year 1990 saw 82,500 Catholics and 210 parishes in the diocese.  By 2004 there were 78,000 Catholics and 200 parishes.

Bishops of Huesca

 c. 522–546 : Elpidius
 c. 546–556 : Pompeianus
 557–576 : Vincent
 576–600 : Gabinius
 --------------- : Ordulfus - (Mentioned between 633 and 638)
 --------------- : Eusebius - (Mentioned in 653)
 --------------- : Gadisclo - (Mentioned in 683)
 --------------- : Audebertus - (Mentioned in 693)
713–1096 : Huesca under Moorish rule.
 --------------- : Nitidius - (Late 8th century)
 --------------- : Frontinianus - (Early 9th century)

Among the bishops of Aragon were:

 . c. 920 : Iñigo
 . c. 922 : Ferriolus
 933–947 : Fortuño
 971–978 : Aureolus
 . c. 981 : Atón
 1011–1036 : Mancius
 1036–1057 : García
 1058–1075 : Sancho
 1076–1086 : García Ramírez
 1087–1097 : Peter

1096 : Huesca conquered by king Peter I of Aragon.
 1097–1099 : Pedro
 1099–1130 : Esteban
 1130–1134 : Arnaldo Dodón
 1134–1160 : Dodón
 --------- 1162 : Martín
 1166–1185 : Esteban de San Martín
 1187–1201 : Ricardo
 1201–1236 : García de Gudal
 1238–1252 : Vidal de Canellas
 1253–1269 : Domingo de Solá
 1269–1273 : García Pérez de Zuazo
 1273–1290 : Jaime Sarroca
 1290–1300 : Ademar
 1300–1313 : Martín López de Azlor
 1313–1324 : Martín Oscabio
 1324–1328 : Gastón de Moncada
 1328–1336 : Pedro de Urrea
 1337–1345 : Bernardo Oliver
 1345–1348 : Gonzalo Zapata
 1348–1357 : Pedro Glascario
 1357–1361 : Guillermo de Torrellás
 1362–1364 : Bernardo Folcaut
 1364–1368 : Jimeno Sánchez de Ribabellosa
 1369–1372 : Juan Martínez
 1372–1383 : Fernando Pérez Muñoz
 1383–1384 : Berenguer de Anglesola
 1384–1393 : Francisco Riquer y Bastero
 1393–1403 : Juan de Baufés
 1403–1410 : Juan de Tauste
 1410–1415 : Domingo Ram y Lanaja
 1415–1421 : See vacant
 1421–1443 : Hugo de Urríes
 1443–1457 : Guillermo de Siscar
 1458–1465 : Guillermo Pons de Fenollet
 1470–1484 : Antonio de Espés
 1484–1526 : Juan de Aragón y de Navarra
 --------- 1527 : Alonso de So de Castro y de Pinós
 1528–1529 : Diego de Cabrera
 1530–1532 : Lorenzo Campeggio
 1532–1534 : Jerónimo Doria
 1534–1544 : Martín de Gurrea
 1545–1572 : Pedro Agustín
 1572–1574 : Diego de Arnedo
 1577–1584 : Pedro del Frago
 1584–1593 : Martín de Cleriguech
 1594–1607 : Diego de Monreal
 1608–1615 : Berenguer de Bardaxí
 1616–1628 : Juan Moriz de Salazar
 1628–1641 : Francisco Navarro de Eugui
 1641–1654 : Esteban de Esmir
 1644–1670 : Fernando de Sada Azcona
 1671–1674 : Bartolomé de Fontcalda
 1677–1685 : Ramón de Azlor y Berbegal
 1686–1707 : Pedro de Gregorio Antillón
 1708–1714 : Francisco Garcés de Marcilla
 1714–1734 : Pedro Gregorio de Padilla
 1735–1736 : Lucas de Cuartas y Oviedo
 1738–1742 : Plácido Bailés Padilla
 1743–1775 : Antonio Sánchez Sardinero
 1776–1789 : Pascual López Estaún
 1790–1792 : Cayetano de la Peña Granada
 1793–1797 : Juan Armada Araujo
 1797–1809 : Joaquín Sánchez de Cutanda
 1815–1832 : Eduardo Sáenz de la Guardia
 1833–1845 : Lorenzo Ramón Lahoz
 1848–1851 : See vacant
 1851–1861 : Pedro José de Zarandia
 1861–1870 : Basilio Gil Bueno
 1875–1886 : Honorio María de Onaindía
 1888–1895 : Vicente Alda Sancho
 1895–1918 : Mariano Supervía Lostalé, (or Mariano Supervía y Lostalé)
 1918–1922 : Zacarías Martínez Núñez
 1922–1934 : Mateo Colom Canals
 1935–1973 : Lino Rodrigo Ruesca
 1965–1969 : Jaime Flores Martín - (Apostolic Administrator)
 -------- 1969 : Damián Iguacén Borau -  (Apostolic Administrator)
 1969–1977 : Javier Osés Flamarique - (Apostolic Administrator)
 1977–2001 : Javier Osés Flamarique
 2001–2003 : Juan José Omella Omella - (Apostolic Administrator)
 2003–2009 : Jesús Sanz Montes

See also
 Huesca Cathedral
 List of the Roman Catholic dioceses of Spain

References

  Catholic Encyclopedia, 1910: Diocese of Huesca and Diocese of Jaca
  IBERCRONOX: Obispado de Huesca (Osca) and Obispado de Aragón

External links 
  Official Diocese of Huesca website

Huesca
Huesca
Aragonese culture